Senator Benoit may refer to:

John J. Benoit (1951–2016), 
Paula Benoit (born 1955), Maine State Senate